The 1927–28 NCAA championships were contested by the NCAA during the 1927–28 collegiate academic school year, the NCAA's seventh season of championships, to determine the team and individual national champions of its three sponsored sports.

Wrestling was introduced as the NCAA's third officially-sponsored sport this season.

Before the introduction of the separate University Division and College Division before the 1955–56 school year, a single national championship was conducted for each sport. Women's sports were not added until 1981–82.

Championships

Season results

Team titles, by university

Cumulative results

Team titles, by university

References

1927 in American sports
1928 in American sports